Mill Creek is a tributary of the Clarion River in Clarion and Jefferson counties, Pennsylvania in the United States.

Mill Creek joins the Clarion River near the borough of Strattanville.

Fishing
The Pennsylvania Fish and Boat Commission stocks the creek with brook trout three times per year, first in the spring before the opening day of the Pennsylvania trout season then two in-season stockings during May.

See also
 List of rivers of Pennsylvania
 List of tributaries of the Allegheny River

References

Rivers of Pennsylvania
Tributaries of the Allegheny River
Rivers of Clarion County, Pennsylvania
Rivers of Jefferson County, Pennsylvania